Elio Gnagnarelli (born 11 October 1946) is an Italian former sports shooter. He competed in the men's 50 metre rifle, prone event at the 1984 Summer Olympics.

References

External links
 

1946 births
Living people
Italian male sport shooters
Olympic shooters of Italy
Shooters at the 1984 Summer Olympics
People from Ortona
Sportspeople from the Province of Chieti